Anatole Delassus (born 2001) is a French slalom canoeist who has competed at the international level since 2018.

He won a silver medal in the Extreme K1 event at the 2022 World Championships in Augsburg.

World Cup individual podiums

References

External links

Living people
French male canoeists
Medalists at the ICF Canoe Slalom World Championships
2001 births